The  was an electric multiple unit (EMU) train type in Japan, operated by Keio Corporation on its suburban Tokyo commuter rail network between 1972 and 2011. Sets were refurbished from 1986 to extend their service life.

A four-car formation was used on the Keio Dobutsuen Line as a wanman driver-only-operated shuttle service.

Technical specifications
 Motor output: 
 Formation: 2 cars (cleared for Toei Shinjuku Line), 3 cars, 4 cars, 5 cars, 6 cars, 8 cars
 Control system: field chopper (initial car was resistance control)
 Some have 5 doors, but some were rebuilt with 4 doors. 4-car trains (only used on Dōbutsuen Line) and 6-car trains had 5 pairs of doors on each side, and 5-car sets had rebuilt cars.

Operations
 Keiō Line (including Keiō New Line)
 Keiō Dōbutsuen Line
 Keiō Sagamihara Line
 Keiō Takao Line
 Keiō Keibajō Line
 Toei Shinjuku Line

Interior
Passenger accommodation consisted of longitudinal bench seating throughout.

History
The first units entered service on 23 May 1972.

The type was withdrawn from service on 13 March 2011.

DeWa 600 series
Three cars were converted to maintenance cars and reclassified as DeWa 600 series in October 2004. The DeWa 600 series replaced the older DeWa 5000 series maintenance cars which were operated since 1995. The remodeling went as follows:
 6107 (set 6707) → 601 (the cab from car 6707 was transferred)
 6407 (set 6708) → 621 (a simple cab was added)
 6457 (set 6708) → 631
The cars received a new grey livery with red and white diagonal stripes.

The DeWa 600 series was used with ChiKi 290 or KuYa 900 sandwiched between cars 601 and 621. It also served as a shunting vehicle at Wakabadai depot.

Following the introduction of successor maintenance cars DeYa 901 and DeYa 902 in September 2015, the DeWa 600 series was withdrawn from service and scrapped in April 2016.

References

External links

Electric multiple units of Japan
6000 series
Train-related introductions in 1972
1500 V DC multiple units of Japan